Zêzere may refer to:
 Zêzere River
 Zêzere Castle - in Vila Nova da Barquinha Municipality;
 Dornelas do Zêzere - uma freguesia portuguesa do concelho da Pampilhosa da Serra Municipality;
 Ferreira do Zêzere - um concelho português banhado pelo rio do mesmo nome;
 Ferreira do Zêzere (freguesia)
 Santa Marinha do Zêzere - uma freguesia portuguesa do concelho de Baião Municipality.